Uvariopsis zenkeri Engl. is a species of flowering shrub in the family Annonaceae endemic to Cameroon and the Central African Republic.

Description
U. zenkeri is a shrub of 1–4 m high and  bears its monoecious inflorescences on the old wood of both its branches and its trunk. Its petals are joined at the base of the flower.

Etymology 
The specific epithet zenkeri honours the German botanist Georg August Zenker, who discovered the first specimen at Bipindi in the Cameroons in 1896.

Distribution
This species is found in shadow on laterite at an altitude of 120 m  in Cameroon, and in the fringing forest of the rain-forest in the Central African Republic. IUCN, however, lists this species as endemic to Cameroon.

Taxonomy
This plant was first described by Engler in 1899, and is the type species of Uvariopsis.

References

External links 
  Gereau, R.E. & Kenfack, D. (2000)  « Le genre Uvariopsis (Annonaceae) en Afrique tropicale, avec la description d’une espèce nouvelle du Cameroun » Adansonia, sér. 3 22(1):39-43
  Onana, J.-M. (2013) Synopsis des espèces végétales vasculaires endémiques et rares du Cameroun : check-liste pour la gestion durable et la conservation de la biodiversité,Yaoundé. Ministère de la Recherche scientifique et de l'Innovation, coll. « Flore du Cameroun » (no 40) p. 71
 Kenfack, D., Gosline,G., Gereau, R.E. & Schatz, G.E. (2003) 
 Onana, J.-M. (2011) The vascular plants of Cameroon a taxonomic checklist with IUCN assessments . National herbarium of Cameroon, Yaoundé
 Spécimens (Muséum national d'histoire naturelle)

Flora of Cameroon
Annonaceae
Cauliflory
Taxa named by Adolf Engler